Milton is an unincorporated community in Calaveras County, California. The community is in ZIP code 95684 and area code 209.

Completion of the Southern Pacific Railroad in 1871 marked the birth of the town of Milton. Named after Milton Latham, one of the railroad construction engineers, this town was the first in Calaveras County to have a railroad. Freight and passengers continued their journeys to other parts of Calaveras County by wagon and stagecoach.  The town was also the terminus of the Stockton and Copperopolis Railroad.

The town today is registered as California Historical Landmark #262.

A post office was established in 1871 and closed in 1942.

Politics

See also
Waverly Fire

References

External links

Unincorporated communities in California
Unincorporated communities in Calaveras County, California
California Historical Landmarks
Populated places established in 1871
1871 establishments in California